WikiBilim Public Foundation is a nonprofit organization operating in the Republic of Kazakhstan. The organization was established for developing and promoting online educational content in the Kazakh language. "Wiki" - means content generated by users, "Bilim" means knowledge.

History
The organization was founded as a non-profit public foundation by Rauan Kenzhekhanuly, Timur Muktarov, Nartay Ashim and Marat Isbayev in May 2011. The starting project for WikiBilim was the Kazakh Wikipedia in Kazakhstan and developing community in Kazakh Wikipedia.,

WikiBilim began negotiations with Wikimedia Foundation in the beginning of May 2011. On 16 May 2011, WikiBilim announced itself as a project dedicated to Wikipedia in Kazakhstan, during a press conference. The chairman of the Wikimedia Foundation Board, Mr. Ting Chen, himself came to support the Kazakh Wikipedia.  Moreover, participating in the press conference were a member of the Kazakh Parliament, Murat Abenov, as well as the chair of the Kazakh National Encyclopedia, Bauyrzhan Zhaqyp, along with a leader of KazContent.

At the conference, Chen announced that Wikimedia Foundation supported WikiBilim and appreciated its efforts to expand the Kazakh Wikipedia. The Kazakh National Encyclopedia officially confirmed provision of its entire material with a license CC-BY-SA 3.0 that permits publishing all the encyclopedia materials to the Kazakh Wikipedia. Nokia Corporation announced its sponsorship to the Вики-бәйге contest, where it would give 40 cell phones to the best editors of the Kazakh Wikipedia.  In June 2011, sophomore students of International IT University volunteered as contributors to the Kazakh Wikipedia, to work on wiki coding of the prepared materials and publish them to the Kazakh Wikipedia.

In August 2011, Haifa, during the Wikimania 2011 Jimmy Wales presented Kenzhekhanuly with the Wikipedian of the Year award. Moreover, Wales announced his own grant to WikiBilim as a contribution to the development of the Kazakh Wikipedia. The Wikimedia Foundation has given the organisation a $16,600 grant for conducting Turkic Wikimedia Conference in Almaty. Contributors to Wikipedia in the West have raised the question of whether the foundation and Wales should be supporting WikiBilim in light of the backing it has received from the Kazakh government, which has been responsible for closing down independent media outlets in what Human Rights Watch describes as a "growing crackdown on free speech".

On 14–17 September 2011 the Wikibilim Public Foundation were invited to take part on the Digital Communications Kazakhstan 2011 Exhibition, where it introduced its methods of recruiting youth to startup projects.
 
On 16–18 September 2011, WikiBilim Public Foundation representatives went to the conference of the Creative Commons Global Summit in Warsaw, Poland. The purpose of this trip was to include Kazakhstan among the countries that work on distribution of information under the Creative Commons standards.
 
On 27 September 2011, Wikibilim organized a Wiki-seminar at the Kazakh National Pedagogue University for Women Almaty, Kazakhstan.
 
On 28 September 2011, the Kazakh National Academy of Arts hosted a presentation about the WikiBilim Public Foundation.
 
In October 2011, WikiBilim conducted a training session and seminar at the Nazarbayev University. The purpose of the seminar was to create a Wiki-Club with wiki ambassadors on the university campus, and this club would focus on recruiting Kazakhstan youth to improve usage of the Kazakh national language, education, and science.

Objectives
 Contribute to and support the online development of Kazakh language, education, culture and innovative technologies.
 Develop the IT sphere in Kazakhstan, in general.
 Organize educational projects for youth.
 Sponsor social projects.
 Modernize information and communication systems for Kazakh content.
 Contribute to the overall development of Kazakhstan's Internet content.
 Develop improved communication for information in education.
 Organize contests, awards, and social gatherings of Kazakh content contributors.
 Support improvement of systematizing of laws in Kazakhstan.

Projects 
WikiBilim is working on several different projects to promote its mission:

Kazakh Wikipedia 
The Kazakh Wikipedia was the first project of the WikiBilim Public Fund, which kicked off in June 2011. The purpose of the project was to improve the quality as well as the amount of the material, and to increase the number of active users in the Kazakh Wikipedia. The intention was also to create an intellectual community, where members could share with their knowledge in Kazakh language, and, eventually, turn the community into an everyday hobby. The supporters of the project were the Samruk-Kazyna Welfare Fund, which provided 100 laptops for the most active 100 users, and Nokia Corporation which supported the Вики-Бәйге contest, where the forty best users in the Kazakh Wikipedia received Nokia phones. The Ministry of Information and Communication of Kazakhstan Republic helped in organization of events. The Kazakh National Encyclopedia provided its electronic version of their material. International IT University provided its volunteer students for working with material within the Kazakh Wikipedia.

Creative Commons Kazakhstan 
Creative Commons standards adaption in Kazakhstan. This project targets open information share, where people can have a field for easily and effectively share information and knowledge.

Open Library of Kazakhstan (www.kitap.kz) 
On 17 September 2012 WikiBilim Foundation presented Open Library of Kazakhstan, www.kitap.kz published under Creative Commons BY-NC-ND license. Library contains more than 3500 books, 100 audiobooks and 200 audio files.

Google translate and Kazakh language
In 2014, "Wiki Bilim" public foundation implemented the project "Google Translate + Kazakh" on the inclusion of the Kazakh language in the global system of Google.

Funding
As of 2012, the Wikimedia Foundation had also offered a $16,000 grant to WikiBilim for conducting first Turkic Wikimedia Conference in Almaty.

References

External links 
 
 Tengri News

Non-profit organizations based in Kazakhstan
Kazakh language
Wiki communities
Wikimedia movement
2011 establishments in Kazakhstan